Kustermann or Küstermann is a German surname. Notable people with the surname include:

Gottfried Kustermann (born 1943), German sports shooter
Gustav Küstermann (1850–1919), German-American politician

German-language surnames